Del Sol is a census-designated place (CDP) in San Patricio County, Texas, United States. The population was 239 at the 2010 census. Prior to the 2010 census Del Sol was part of the Del Sol-Loma Linda CDP.

Geography
Del Sol is located at  (28.013160, -97.520239).

References

Census-designated places in San Patricio County, Texas
Census-designated places in Texas
Corpus Christi metropolitan area